St John the Evangelist's Church is a Grade I listed parish church in the Church of England in Carlton in Lindrick, Nottinghamshire.

History
The church dates from the 7th century, making it one of the earliest religious foundations in Nottinghamshire.

The tower is from the early Norman period. The tower and chancel arches are also Norman. The north arcade is Transitional Norman and the south was built to imitate it. The church has a Norman font and an alabaster carving of the 15th century.

St Johns forms a joint parish with St Luke's Church, Langold and St Mark's Church, Oldcotes, within the Diocese of Southwell and Nottingham.

References

Church of England church buildings in Nottinghamshire
Carlton in Lindrick
John the Evangelist